Rameez Junaid and Philipp Oswald were the defending champions, but both players chose not to participate.

Potito Starace and Adrian Ungur won the title, defeating Marius Copil and Alexandru-Daniel Carpen 7–5, 6–2 in the final.

Seeds

Draw

Draw

References
 Main Draw

Sibiu Open - Doubles
2014 Doubles
Sibiu Open - Doubles